Stefan Andreasson (born 14 December 1968) is a former football player and since 2008 Director for the Allsvenskan football club IF Elfsborg.

Playing career 
Andreasson played almost his entire career from 1988 and 2001 for Elfsborg except for a short time as a professional in the Italian football club Como Calcio 1997 / 98. Overall Andreasson played 1292 matches for Elfsborg, of which 435 were in the first team, including 73 games in the Allsvenskan.

Post-playing career 
1999 Andreasson took over as sporting director in Elfsborg. He has been in the role of sporting director considered to be an important part of Elfsborg success during the second half of the 2000s, with victory in the Allsvenskan 2006 as the greatest success. He was behind recruitments of including Anders Svensson, Mathias Svensson and Stefan Ishizaki.

Personal life 
Andreasson's son Anton currently plays for IF Elfsborg.

References

1968 births
Association football executives
IF Elfsborg players
Living people
Swedish footballers
IF Elfsborg directors and chairmen
Como 1907 players
People from Borås
Association football midfielders
Sportspeople from Västra Götaland County